Plotopteridae is an extinct family of flightless seabirds with uncertain placement, generally considered as member of order Suliformes. They exhibited remarkable convergent evolution with the penguins, particularly with the now extinct giant penguins. That they lived in the North Pacific, the other side of the world from the penguins, has led to them being described at times as the Northern Hemisphere's penguins, though they were not closely related. More recent studies have shown, however, that the shoulder-girdle, forelimb and sternum of plotopterids differ significantly from those of penguins, so comparisons in terms of function may not be entirely accurate. Plotopterids are regarded as closely related to Anhingidae (darters) and Phalacrocoracidae (cormorants). On the other hand, there is a theory that this group may have a common ancestor with penguins due to the similarity of forelimb and brain morphology. However, the endocast morphology of stem group Sphenisciformes differs from both Plotopteridae and modern penguins.

Their fossils have been found in California, Oregon, Washington, British Columbia, Hokkaido, Tōhoku, Chūbu, Kyushu. They seem to have evolved on arctic islands during the mid-Eocene, spreading southwards with the formation of kelp forests  They ranged in size from that of a large cormorant (such as a Brandt's cormorant), to very large size, with femur length two times longer than emperor penguin. They had shortened wings optimised for underwater wing-propelled pursuit diving (like penguins or the now extinct great auk), and a body skeleton similar to that of the darter.

The second species to be named from rocks along the eastern Pacific Ocean was Tonsala hildegardae from the late Oligocene lower part of the Pysht Formation in Washington State. More fossils of T. hildegardae have since been described  and included some of the first known examples of borings made by the marine bone-eating worm Osedax in bird bones.

The earliest known member of the family, Phocavis maritimus lived in the late Eocene, but most of the known species lived during Oligocene time, becoming extinct in the early to mid-Miocene. That they became extinct at the same time as the giant penguins of the Southern Hemisphere, which also coincided with the radiation of the seals and dolphins, has led to speculation that the expansion of marine mammals was responsible for the extinction of the Plotopteridae, though this has not been formally tested.

References

 
Extinct flightless birds
Paleogene birds of North America
Extinct animals of the United States
Taxa named by Hildegarde Howard
Prehistoric bird families